The Germanic SS was the collective name given to paramilitary and political organisations established in parts of German-occupied Europe between 1939 and 1945 under the auspices of the Schutzstaffel (SS). The units were modeled on the Allgemeine SS in Nazi Germany and established in Belgium, Denmark, the Netherlands, and Norway—population groups who were considered  to be especially "racially suitable" by the Nazis. They typically served as local security police augmenting German units of the Gestapo, Sicherheitsdienst (SD), and other departments of the German Reich Security Main Office (RSHA), rendering them culpable for their participation in Nazi atrocities.

Establishment
The Nazi idea behind co-opting additional Germanic people into the SS stems to a certain extent from the Völkisch belief that the original Aryan-Germanic homeland rested in Scandinavia and that, in a racial-ideological sense, people from there or the neighbouring northern European regions were a human reservoir of Nordic/Germanic blood. Conquest of Western Europe gave the Germans, and especially the SS, access to these "potential recruits" who were considered part of the wider "Germanic family". Four of these conquered nations were ripe with Germanic peoples according to Nazi estimations (Denmark, Norway, Netherlands, and Flanders). Heinrich Himmler referred to people from these lands in terms of their Germanic suitability as, "blutsmässig unerhört wertvolle Kräfte" ("by blood exceptionally valuable assets"). Accordingly, some of them were recruited into the SS and enjoyed the highest privileges as did foreign workers from these regions, to include unrestrained sexual contact with German women. Eager to expand their reach, Nazis like Chief of the SS Main Office, Gottlob Berger considered the Germanic SS as foundational for a burgeoning German Empire.

Himmler's vision for a Germanic SS started with grouping the Netherlands, Belgian, and French Flanders together into a western-Germanic state called Burgundia, which would be policed by the SS as a security buffer for Germany. In 1940, the first manifestation of the Germanic SS appeared in Flanders as the Allgemeene SS Vlaanderen to be joined two-months later by the Dutch Nederlandsche SS, and in May 1941 the Norwegian Norges SS was formed. The final nation to contribute to the Germanic SS was Denmark, whose Germansk Korpset (later called the Schalburg Corps) came into being in April 1943. For the SS, they did not think of their compatriots in terms of national borders but in terms of Germanic racial makeup, known conceptually to them as Deutschtum, a greater idea which transcended traditional political boundaries. While the SS leadership foresaw an imperialistic and semi-autonomous relationship for the Nordic or Germanic countries like Denmark, the Netherlands, and Norway as co-bearers of a greater Germanic empire, Hitler refused to grant them the same degree of independence despite ongoing pressure from ranking members of the SS.

Duties and participation in atrocities

The purpose of the Germanic SS was to enforce Nazi racial doctrine, especially anti-Semitic ideas. They typically served as local security police augmenting German units of the Gestapo, Sicherheitsdienst (SD), and other main departments of the Reich Security Main Office (Reichssicherheitshauptamt, RSHA). Their principal responsibilities during wartime were to root-out partisans, subversive organizations, and any group opposed to Nazi ideas. In other cases, these foreign units of the SS were employed by major German firms to distribute propaganda for the Nazi cause among their compatriots and to police and control workers. In addition, the inclusion of other Germanic peoples was part of the Nazi attempt to collectively Germanize Europe, and for them, Germanization entailed the creation of an empire ruled by Germanic people at the expense of other races.

One of the most notorious groups was in the Netherlands, where the Germanic SS was employed to round-up Jews. Of the 140,000 Jews that had lived in the Netherlands prior to 1940, around 24,000 survived the war by hiding. Despite their relatively small numbers, a total of 512 Jews from Oslo were hunted down by the Norwegian Police and the Germanske SS Norge (Norwegian General SS); once caught, they were deported to Auschwitz. More Jews were rounded-up elsewhere, but the total number of Norwegian Jews captured never reached a thousand throughout the course of the war. Similar measures were planned by the SS against Danish Jews, who totaled about 6,500, but most of them managed to go into hiding or escape to Sweden before the senior German representative in Denmark, SS-General Werner Best, could marshal the SS forces at his disposal and complete his planned raids and deportations.

Organizations
The following countries raised active Germanic SS detachments:

An underground Nazi organization also existed in Switzerland, known as the Germanische SS Schweiz. It had very few members and was considered merely a splinter Nazi group by Swiss authorities.

Germanic battalions

Separately from the Germanic SS, a number of so-called Germanic Battalions (Germanische Sturmbanne) were established in September 1942 as part of the Allgemeine SS from among Flemish, Dutch, Norwegian, and Swiss expatriates and volunteer workers in Germany. A Danish unit in Berlin was disbanded in January 1943 amid a lack of personnel. In total, the total number of members was only 2,179 in March 1944.

Postwar
After the war, many Germanic SS members were tried by their respective countries for treason. Independent war crimes trials outside the jurisdiction of the Nuremberg Trials were conducted in several European countries, such as in the Netherlands, Norway and Denmark, leading to several death sentences; an example being the commander of the Schalburg Corps, K.B. Martinsen. In Norway, Lie committed suicide.

See also
 Waffen-SS foreign volunteers and conscripts
 Pan-Germanism — a concept popularised before the First World War
 Nazi Party/Foreign Organization — the Nazi Party's foreign administration

References
Informational notes

Citations

Bibliography

 

  
 

 

 

 

Nazi SS
Norway in World War II
Denmark in World War II
Netherlands in World War II
Belgium in World War II
Switzerland in World War II
Collaboration with Nazi Germany‎